The 1878 Wellington City mayoral election was part of the New Zealand local elections held that same year to decide who would take the office of Mayor of Wellington.

Background
Joe Dransfield, the incumbent Mayor, sought re-election for another year. He was opposed by former mayor William Hutchison, who had withdrawn from the previous year's election (along with another candidate) enabling Dransfield to be elected unopposed. Dransfield was elected once again. The result was very close with two votes being the majority for Drandfield. There were a number of cases of personation reported on election day. Supporters of Hutchison also attempted to get the election's legality reviewed in the Supreme Court, disputing the validity on several grounds, one being that five or six people enrolled having no legal right to vote.

Election results
The following table gives the election results:

Notes

References

Mayoral elections in Wellington
1878 elections in New Zealand
Politics of the Wellington Region
1870s in Wellington
November 1878 events